The Vauban was an express train that linked Brussels Midi/Zuid in Brussels, Belgium, with France, Switzerland and Italy.  Introduced in 1988, it was operated by the National Railway Company of Belgium (NMBS/SNCB), the Chemins de Fer Luxembourgeois (CFL), the SNCF, the Swiss Federal Railways (SBB-CFF-FFS), and the Italian State Railways (FS).

The train is named after Sébastien Le Prestre (1633–1707), Seigneur de Vauban and later Marquis de Vauban (and commonly referred to as Vauban), who was a Marshal of France and the foremost military engineer of his age.

The Vauban was one of two EuroCity train-pairs running daily between Brussels and Basel, Switzerland; the other was the EC Iris.

Original route

History
The Vauban began operating on 29 May 1988, and was classified from the start as a EuroCity (EC) service. It originally carried through coaches to Milano, running via Lugano and Chiasso southbound and via Brig northbound, but was not classified as an EC south of Basel.

In summer 1992, the train's route was changed to run via Brig in both directions, and the train was classified as an EC throughout its route. The section between Brig and Milano later began to operate for only part of the year, and in autumn 2004 it was discontinued entirely, making the EC Vaubans route Brussels – Basel – Bern – Brig.

In June 2007, the route was diverted to terminate in Interlaken (Ost station); it was soon diverted again, to terminate in Zurich, in December 2007.

In December 2007, the Vauban was classified as an InterRegio (IR) on the portion of its route within Switzerland, because it did not meet all the criteria for a EuroCity, but it retained EuroCity status between Brussels and Basel. The eastbound service was cut back to Brussels–Basel in December 2011, while the westbound service still departed from Zurich; in December 2013 the latter was also cut back to start in Basel. The service was cancelled in 2016, when a TGV service between Brussels and Strasbourg was introduced. Alternatively, passengers still can take an InterCity train between Brussels and Luxembourg, then a train to Strasbourg and change again to reach Basel.

See also

 History of rail transport in Belgium
 History of rail transport in France
 History of rail transport in Italy
 History of rail transport in Luxembourg
 History of rail transport in Switzerland
 List of named passenger trains of Europe

References

External links
Rail.lu: Vauban – images of the train

EuroCity
International named passenger trains
Named passenger trains of Belgium
Named passenger trains of France
Named passenger trains of Italy
Named passenger trains of Luxembourg
Named passenger trains of Switzerland
Railway services introduced in 1988